Edward Jablonski (March 1, 1922 – February 10, 2004) was the author of several biographies on American cultural personalities, such as George Gershwin, Harold Arlen, Alan Jay Lerner, and Irving Berlin, as well as books on aviation history.

Early life
Jablonski was born in Bay City, Michigan to a family of Polish-American journalists and writers. His father had been a writer for Sztandar Polski and another relative, Paul F. Jablonski, wrote for the Bay City Times. Early on he fell in love with the music of George and Ira Gershwin. A fan letter he wrote to Ira while in school quickly turned into regular correspondence and eventually a lasting friendship with the lyricist.

While Jablonski was interested in music, his true fascination was with aviation. Supposedly, he spent much of his time watching the planes at the James Clements Airport near the South End of Bay City. Later on in his life, he became interested in aerial warfare. Telling an interviewer in 1986, "Aviation makes possible the most deadly form of warfare ever -- the perversion of one of man's greatest inventions."

Military and writing career 
He served in the United States Army Field Artillery in New Guinea during World War II.  For his actions in New Guinea, he was awarded the Silver Star.

After leaving the army, he attended junior college in Bay City as a pre-journalism major. He continued his studies at the New School for Social Research, receiving his bachelor's in 1950. He also completed postgraduate work in anthropology at Columbia.

In 1949, Jablonski and Peter Bartok co-founded Walden Records. The company was a short-lived recording studio in New York City that specialized in American pop music.

While working for the March of Dimes charity in New York, Jablonski wrote articles and music reviews for a number of small magazines as well as liner notes for albums; this was the beginning of a fifty-year freelance career.

At the time of his death, he was working on Masters of American Song, which would have been a comprehensive history of American pop music.

Works
 
 
  (1968 )
 
 
  (1979  )
 

  Reprinted by DaCapo press in 1982.  
 
 
  (1985 paperback , 1996 )
  (paperback )

Legacy
His book collection is held by the Pritzker Military Museum & Library in Chicago, Illinois.

References

External links 

 

1922 births
2004 deaths
American male biographers
American writers about music
American historians
20th-century American historians
American military writers
American military historians
Aviation historians
American aviation historians
Aviation writers
American aviation writers
American people of Polish descent
20th-century American biographers
20th-century American male writers
American expatriates in Papua New Guinea
United States Army personnel of World War II